The 93rd Indianapolis 500 was held at the Indianapolis Motor Speedway in Speedway, Indiana on Sunday May 24, 2009. It was the 14th Indy 500 sanctioned by the Indy Racing League, and the premier event of the 2009 IndyCar Series season.

Hélio Castroneves, a native of Brazil, won the race from the pole position, his third of four Indy 500 victories. He became the first foreign-born three-time winner of the race, and tied a record by winning the race three times in the same decade (2001, 2002, 2009). The win was car owner Roger Penske's 15th Indy 500 triumph, extending his team's own record. Former winner Dan Wheldon of England came second, with Danica Patrick third, the best finish ever by a female driver. There were eight crashes, with Vítor Meira and Tony Kanaan both suffering non-permanent injuries.

The 2009 Indianapolis 500 began a three-year Centennial Era celebration which marks the 100th anniversary of the opening of the Indianapolis Motor Speedway. 2011 marked the 100th anniversary of the first Indy 500.

The victory by Castroneves marked the milestone 60th Indianapolis 500 victory for Firestone. It came less than two months after Castroneves was acquitted of federal charges of tax evasion and conspiracy. The IRS filed the charges against Castroneves in the fall of 2008, and the trial was held in March 2009 at the U.S. District Court in Miami. A guilty verdict in the trial would have likely sent Castroneves to prison, and ended his driving career.

Schedule

Other selected events
May 21: Firestone Indy Lights practice and qualifying
May 22: Freedom 100

Entry list
See Team and Driver Chart for more information

The official entry list was released April 20. The initial list includes 77 cars for 40 entries. 32 driver–car combinations have already been announced, as of Monday, May 4. Among the participants include five former winners (Lazier, Castroneves, Wheldon, Franchitti, Dixon), and six rookies.

Paul Tracy, the runner-up of the controversial 2002 race, returned for the first time since that race, and Scott Sharp also returns. However, this would mark the final IndyCar Series race for the 1996 Indy Racing League co-champion.

Race and event news

The pace car was the 2010 Chevrolet Camaro SS. It was the first Camaro pace car since 1993, and the first time the Corvette was not the pace car since 2003. Actor Josh Duhamel served as the driver.
Miss America Katie Stam sang "America the Beautiful" during the pre-race ceremonies. Jim Nabors traditionally performed "Back Home Again in Indiana."
The pre-race fly-by was conducted by two vintage B-25 Mitchell bombers to honor Disabled American Veterans In addition, a ten-member firing detail from the Indiana National Guard executed the three-volley salute.
The Centennial Era Balloon Festival opened the month of activities on May 1–3.
The 33rd annual OneAmerica 500 Festival Mini-Marathon was held May 2. Drivers Will Power and Mike Conway participated.
3 Doors Down headlined the annual Carb Day concert.
NASCAR team Richard Petty Motorsports collaborated with Dreyer & Reinbold Racing in fielding an entry for veteran John Andretti.
The drivers of the starting field participated in the annual New York City publicity tour at Herald Square on May 18.
The 2009 race would prove to be the final time that Team Penske ran the Marlboro colors at the Speedway. During the offseason that followed the 2009 IndyCar season, Phillip Morris USA ended their relationship with Penske Racing, closing out a 21-year partnership.

Practice – Week 1

Tuesday May 5 – Rookie Orientation
Weather: Partly cloudy, 
Practice summary: Nine drivers took to the track for the first day of rookie orientation. Six rookies participated and three veterans took refresher tests. Robert Doornbos, Raphael Matos, Alex Tagliani, and Mike Conway completed all four phases of the rookie test. Nelson Philippe completed three phases, while Stanton Barrett finished two. No incidents were reported.

Wednesday May 6 – Rookie Orientation & IndyCar Series practice
Weather: Rain, 
Practice summary: The second session of rookie orientation began at 9 a.m. Three cars took to the track for 45 minutes before rain interrupted the session. Nelson Philippe completed the final phase of his rookie test. All veteran practice was washed out for the day.

Thursday May 7 – IndyCar Series practice
Weather: , foggy in the morning
Practice summary: Practice opened early to make up for lost time on Wednesday. Veterans took to the track for the first time just before 11 a.m. At 2:19 p.m., Ryan Hunter-Reay spun exiting turn two and hit the outside wall down the backstretch. He was not injured. A busy day of practice saw 2,199 practice laps completed.

Friday May 8 – IndyCar Series Fast Friday practice
Weather: , cloudy, light rain in the afternoon
Practice summary: The final full day of practice was held before pole qualifying. Two significant crashes occurred. At 12:30 p.m., rookie Robert Doornbos went high and crashed into the wall in turn two. The car continued to slide down the backstretch. About two hours later, Scott Sharp lost the back end in the southchute, and crashed hard in turn two. Both drivers climbed from their cars. Largely aided by a tow, both Penske cars broke the 225 mph barrier. Midway through the afternoon, a light shower delayed practice for one hour.

Time trials – Weekend 1

Saturday May 9 – Pole day

Weather: , sunny and windy
Television: Versus (Bob Jenkins, Robbie Buhl, Jon Beekhuis, Jack Arute, Robbie Floyd, Lindy Thackston)
Rating: 0.35 (385,000 households)
Practice summary
Windy conditions kept many speeds down during the morning practice session. Robert Doornbos crashed for the second day in a row in turn two, this time in his backup car. Penske teammates Ryan Briscoe (225.182 mph) and Hélio Castroneves (224.525 mph) again led the speed chart. Later in the afternoon, Dan Wheldon hit a gust of wind and backed the car into the wall in turn two. He would not go on to make a qualifying attempt.

Time trials summary
The first wave of qualifiers began at 12 noon. Justin Wilson was the first car to complete an attempt. Marco Andretti was second out, and put himself on the provisional pole at 222.789 mph. It did not last long, as Penske driver Ryan Briscoe up the speed to 224.131 mph. Hélio Castroneves rounded out the first wave of time trials, filling the field to eleven cars, and tentatively putting himself second on the grid.

About an hour later, Dario Franchitti squeezed himself into the front row as second-fastest. Later, his Ganassi teammate Scott Dixon also completed a run, but did not threaten the top three. Meanwhile, Wilson's run was disallowed due to an improper ballast location, and Tony Kanaan was disqualified for being underweight.

At 3:45 p.m., Danica Patrick was the first to withdraw an earlier speed and go out for a second attempt. She improved her speed by nearly a mile per hour. Hélio Castroneves then withdrew and took to the track. His 224.864 mph run took over the pole position. Several drivers took their shot, but no one was able to bump Castroneves from the pole position. Sitting on the bubble, Paul Tracy endured seven instances where his car was re-instated to the field (due to cars withdrawing). However, he ultimately was bumped. With five minutes left in the day, Alex Lloyd made his first attempt. He surprisingly bumped his way into the field, and held on to make the top 11.

Sunday May 10 – Second day
Weather: , partly cloudy
Practice summary
On only his second lap of the day, rookie Mike Conway spun and crashed hard in turn one, badly damaging the car. Conway was transferred to Methodist Hospital with bruised lungs. Twenty minutes later, Alex Tagliani also wrecked in turn one, but was not injured.

During afternoon practice, John Andretti added to the D & R Team's woes, with a wreck in turn one. Sitting on the bubble, Andretti was practicing in expectations to re-qualify. The back end broke loose, and he slid into the wall. Graham Rahal was following close behind the crash. He went high to avoid debris, but Andretti's car slid right back into his path. Rahal took evasive action, and spun the car inside to avoid contact. He suffered four flat tires, but kept the car off the wall.

Time trials summary
For the second day of time trials, positions 12–22 were open for qualifying. Sarah Fisher started out the day at noon. She slipped in turn one, and completed a disappointing run of 219.911 mph. After one hour, nine additional cars completed runs, including Vítor Meira, Paul Tracy, and Justin Wilson. Fisher withdrew her previous time, and on her second attempt, improved her speed to over 222 mph.

After some downtime, Dan Wheldon, who had wrecked in practice a day earlier, put his car solidly in the field at 222.777 mph. He was followed by surprising runs by Ed Carpenter, and Raphael Matos. At 223.492 mph, Matos was the seventh-fastest car overall in the field, the fastest car of the day, and the first rookie to qualify.

Late in the afternoon, several drivers began jockeying for the final few spots open for the day. Scott Sharp completed a slow run, but eventually withdrew the time. About an hour later, Sharp went back out to try again, this time bumping John Andretti. Andretti had just wrecked his car in practice, and was not going to return to the track for the day. Sharp's speed of 221.333 mph, however, put him on the bubble. He was scheduled to race in the ALMS Utah Grand Prix the following weekend, and hoped to qualify at Indy before departing for Utah.

With 25 minutes left in the day, A. J. Foyt IV bumped out Sharp, and put himself safely in the field. The move left E. J. Viso on the bubble at 221.745 mph. Ryan Hunter-Reay and Alex Tagliani both attempted to bump Viso, but both were too slow and waved off. With about one minute remaining until the 6 o'clock gun, Viso, Davey Hamilton and Sarah Fisher all pulled out of the qualifying line (Hamilton and Fisher were at that point, safely in the field). That allowed Scott Sharp to hurry onto the track just seconds before the gun. Sharp completed a run of 222.162 mph, and bumped out Viso.

Practice – Week 2

Thursday May 14 – IndyCar Series practice
Weather: Cloudy, 
Practice summary: Practice resumed after three off-days, and track activity was busy. Oriol Servià was named to the Rahal Letterman entry, and took his first laps of the month. At 221.353 mph, Servia was the fastest among non-qualified cars. Veteran Buddy Lazier took his first laps of the month as well. No incidents were reported.

Friday May 15 – IndyCar Series practice
Weather: Partly cloudy, 
Practice summary: The final full day of practice saw heavy activity amongst qualified and non-qualified entries. Early in the afternoon, Tomas Scheckter took his first laps of the month. In addition, Mike Conway returned after his crash earlier in the week. The teams spent most of the day running in race trim. The cars took turns running in drafting packs. Of the non-qualified entries, Townsend Bell was fastest, with Oriol Servià next. No incidents on the track were reported. However, practice had to be halted at 5:33 p.m. when a number of the bricks from the famous start/finish line came loose in the mortar, and one chunk flew out.

Time trials – Weekend 2

Saturday May 16 – Third day
Weather: TBA 
Television: Versus (Bob Jenkins, Robbie Buhl, Jon Beekhuis, Jack Arute, Robbie Floyd, Lindy Thackston)
Practice summary
Overnight rains delayed the start of practice until 11:15 a.m. Townsend Bell led the speed chart at 223.580 mph. After practice, rain fell again, closing the track for three hours.
Time trials summary
Track crews dried the track, and Third Day Time Trials began at 3:30 p.m. Ten qualifying attempts were made, and eight were run to completion. Robert Doornbos recovered from his crashes the previous week, and put in the fastest qualifying speed of the day (221.692 mph). Also qualifying early on with solid runs were Townsend Bell, Tomas Scheckter, and Oriol Servià. After a fast first lap, Buddy Lazier's first four-lap qualifying attempt sunk to a slow 216.487 mph.

After an hour of down time, John Andretti was the next car to attempt. His speed of 219.442 was slower than his speed last weekend, but it tentatively put him in the field. Meanwhile, Alex Tagliani and Mike Conway safely qualified. The day wrapped up with a full field of 33 cars. Milka Duno bumped out Buddy Lazier, then Stanton Barrett fell 0.0262 seconds shy of bumping his way into the field.

Sunday May 17 – Bump day
Weather: Sunny, 
Television: Versus (Bob Jenkins, Robbie Buhl, Jon Beekhuis, Jack Arute, Robbie Floyd, Lindy Thackston)
Practice summary
Favorable weather conditions during practice indicated that the track was faster than the previous afternoon. Milka Duno raised eyebrows after turning a lap of 221.568 mph, more than 3 mph faster than her standing qualifying speed. Veteran Bruno Junqueira took his first laps of the month, after landing a ride with Conquest Racing.
Time trials summary
Saturday's two slowest qualifiers, Nelson Philippe and Milka Duno withdrew their times and re-entered the field at much higher speeds. Bruno Junqueira, in his first attempt, bumped John Andretti from the field with ease. In the late afternoon several third day qualifiers followed Philippe and Duno's lead and requalified at faster speeds. Tomas Scheckter withdrew his speed, and greatly improved. Andretti's first two attempts to re-enter the field were unsuccessful, as the team was struggling to trim the car out. With 20 minutes remaining, Andretti's second attempt was just shy of bumping in, and would have been fast enough to bump Tomas Scheckter had Scheckter not withdrawn and re-qualified. He was followed by Buddy Lazier and Stanton Barrett, and both waved off their slow attempts. Neither had managed to gain speed during the afternoon practice, and neither broke 219 mph.

At 5:52 p.m., John Andretti pulled away for his third and final allotted attempt, bumping Ryan Hunter-Reay with a 221.316 mph average. Hunter-Reay got the final attempt to enter the field, and bumped Alex Tagliani from the field by a scant 0.0324 seconds. The 6 o'clock gun, signaling the end of qualifying, fired during Hunter-Reay's run, leaving Tagliani and Lazier waiting in line.

Shortly before midnight on May 17, Conquest Racing announced that Alex Tagliani, who had failed to qualify, would replace Bruno Junqueira in the No. 36 car. Because of the replacement, the car was moved to the last spot in the starting grid.

Carb Day

IndyCar Series final practice
The final hour-long practice was held.

Pit Stop Contest
Team Penske won the 32nd annual pit stop contest, their record tenth overall victory in the event. The teams of Hélio Castroneves and Marco Andretti met in the finals with Castroneves and his chief mechanic Rick Rinaman winning the $40,000 first prize after a 7.962-second pit stop.

Qualification round

Note: Positions 5–8 are eliminated from the competition. Positions 3–4 advance to the quarterfinals. Positions 1–2 received a bye for the quarterfinals, and advanced directly to the semi-finals. Ryan Briscoe and Graham Rahal were randomly selected to bypass the qualifying round and advance directly to the quarterfinals.

Elimination bracket

Starting grid

 Alex Tagliani failed to qualify the #34 Conquest Racing entry, but replaced Bruno Junqueira in the team's #36 entry. Tagliani started from the 33rd position as a result of the driver change.
 = Former Indianapolis 500 winner
 = Indianapolis 500 rookie

Failed to qualify

Race
The green flag was waved off on the first attempt after Hélio Castroneves hit the accelerator in the middle of turn four and the field did not maintain its traditional three-row lineup. The second attempt, although similar in formation, was given the green flag.

During the first lap entering the first short chute, Mario Moraes squeezed Marco Andretti into the wall, crashing both drivers out. Both drivers were out, but Andretti returned briefly later in the race. Moraes held the view that Andretti ran into him, and both drivers expressed their frustration to the TV crews. Andretti said that Moraes is "clueless," while Moraes believed that Andretti checked down on him.

Ryan Hunter-Reay also had a crash on lap 20 which saw his car slide into the pit lane. This capped a brutal month of May for the Vision Racing driver, in which his car never seemed to get up to speed, and he barely even made the 500 field.

Graham Rahal and Davey Hamilton had similar crashes on laps 56 and 83 respectively. Both slowed their cars between turns 3 and 4, drifted up the track, and hit the wall on the front straightaway. Rahal had a similar crash in the 2008 race.

On lap 98, while running third Tony Kanaan suffered a driveshaft failure while at speed in the back stretch, pitching his car into the wall. Kanaan's steering was largely incapacitated and the Brazilian bounced off the backstretch wall and then hit the turn 3 wall. In television interviews, Kanaan appeared visibly shaken. The next day, Tony stated the hit was recorded at 175 G's.

During the first half of the 200-lap event, Scott Dixon, Castroneves and Dario Franchitti swapped the lead with the Dixon–Franchitti Target Chip Ganassi team leading much of the laps. Dixon led laps 91 through 141, with Franchitti close behind to protect him.

Drivers Robert Doornbos, Nelson Philippe, and Justin Wilson, all former Champ Car World Series race winners, had incidents in the middle-to-late stages of the race that ended their respective days. Under the caution for the Philippe incident, Franchitti's fueler got stuck in his car, causing him to lose track position. With nobody to block for him, Dixon was powerless on the restart to stop Castroneves from passing him. The Penske Dallara-Honda cleared Dixon before the cars even entered turn 1. It turned out to be the winning pass.

The scariest incident of the day occurred on lap 173, when Vítor Meira and Raphael Matos collided in turn 1. Both had heavy contact with the wall. Meira's car also flipped on its side and slid along the wall for hundreds of feet before falling back to all four wheels on the track. Meira was taken to Methodist hospital after the incident. Meira broke two vertebrae in his back and spent the next two days in the hospital being fitted for a back brace. Matos suffered a bruised right knee in the crash.

Ryan Briscoe had fallen back to the middle of the pack with a bad set of tires, but short-fueled in a late round of pit stops to claim second place, behind teammate Castroneves. Eventually Briscoe attempted to take the lead, with the intention of pulling Castroneves along, in order to help the Brazilian save fuel by using the draft. However, he had to pit during the Meira–Matos caution and was never a factor to win.

In the final 15 laps, Castroneves maintained a gap over Dan Wheldon, Danica Patrick and Townsend Bell. Castroneves and Wheldon kept similar lap speeds of 218 mph through the last 15 laps, but with a gap of roughly eight car lengths and Patrick on his tail, Wheldon could not catch the pole-sitter.

Castroneves won the event as his sister, Kati, and mother celebrated. The driver and his crew engaged in his traditional victory celebration, climbing the frontstretch catch fence, to the delight of the crowd. It was his third career Indianapolis 500 victory, with the others coming in 2001 and 2002. He is the sixth driver to win three 500s and the first foreign-born driver to do so.

Race results
All cars utilized Dallara chassis, Honda engines, and Firestone Firehawk tires.

Crashes summary
Ten drivers crashed in the race:
Mario Moraes – lap 1
Marco Andretti – lap 1, re-entered race at leaders' lap 61
Ryan Hunter-Reay – lap 20
Graham Rahal – lap 56
Davey Hamilton – lap 83
Tony Kanaan – lap 98
Nelson Philippe – lap 131
Justin Wilson – lap 161
Vítor Meira, Raphael Matos – lap 174

Broadcasting

Television
The race was televised in high definition in the United States on ABC, the 45th consecutive year on that network. ABC Sports signed a four-year extension to continue covering the Indianapolis 500 through 2012. Marty Reid served as anchor for the fourth year. For the fourth time, the telecast utilized the Side-by-Side format for commercial breaks.

Time trials and Carb Day were shown live in high definition on Versus, part of a new ten-year contract with the network and the Indy Racing League. Bob Jenkins served as anchor, along with Robbie Buhl and Jon Beekhuis as analysts. Jack Arute, Robbie Floyd, and Lindy Thackston covered the pits.

Radio
The race was broadcast on radio by the IMS Radio Network. Mike King served as anchor. For the first time, three living "Voices of the 500" joined together to offer commentary during the pre-race. King, Paul Page, and Bob Jenkins recollected their experiences on network. Page remained in the booth to offer commentary and observations throughout the race. Jenkins, who had returned as a turn reporter in 2007-2008, was unable to serve during the race due to his commitments with Versus.

Jake Query moved from the pits to take the turn two location. For 2009, there were only three regular pit reporters, but they were joined by Dave Wilson, who moved from the booth to cover the garage area and infield hospital.

For 2009, as a gesture to the Centennial Era, a special change was made for the famous out-cue "Stay tuned for the greatest spectacle in racing." The out-cues for each commercial break were recordings of previous renditions by the former "Voices of the 500." Each commercial break would feature a different chief announcer, rotating through Sid Collins, Paul Page, Lou Palmer, Bob Jenkins, and Mike King.

See also
List of Indianapolis 500 winners
Indianapolis 500 year by year
2009 IndyCar Series season
Indy Racing League IndyCar Series

References

External links

Indy500.com – Official site
IndyCar.com – Official site
Race Results 

Indianapolis 500 races
Indianapolis 500
Indianapolis 500
Indianapolis 500
Indianapolis 500
Indianapolis 500